Bryan Thomas Mahon,   (2 April 1862 – 29 September 1930) was an Irish general of the British Army, a senator of the short-lived Senate of Southern Ireland, and a member for eight years of the Irish Free State Senate until his death.

Biography

Bryan Thomas Mahon was born at Belleville, County Galway on 2 April 1862. He became a lieutenant in the 8th (King's Royal Irish) Hussars in 1883.

He served in Sudan in the Dongola Expedition in 1896 as Staff officer to Sir Herbert Kitchener, and was present at the Battle of Ferkeh and the operations at Hafir.

In 1899, he took part in the final defeat of the Khalifa as Assistant Adjutant general in charge of Intelligence, and was mentioned in despatches (dated 25 November 1899) by Colonel Wingate with the following words:
I cannot speak in sufficiently strong terms of the excellence of the services performed by this officer. I invariably placed him in general command of all the mounted troops; his personal disregard for danger, intrepid scouting, and careful handling of men, all fit him for high command; his bold and successful seizure of the position in front of Fedil's camp, and his conduct of the fight before I came up, show him to possessed of exceptional qualities as a commander.

In recognition of his service in the Sudan, he received the brevet promotion to colonel on 14 March 1900.

During the Second Boer War Colonel Mahon led a flying column 2,000 strong, consisting mainly of South African volunteers from Kimberley, which came to the Relief of Mafeking. The town, which had been under siege for seven months by Boer forces, was facing starvation. Mahon was appointed a Companion of the Order of the Bath (CB) for his services during the operations, and was invested with the order by King Edward VII on 2 June 1902 after his return to the United Kingdom.

Mahon was appointed a Fellow of the Royal Geographical Society in May 1902, and was briefly Governor of Khartoum in 1903.

During the First World War he commanded the 2nd (Sialkot) Cavalry Brigade and the 10th (Irish) Division during the Gallipoli Campaign. The 10th Division landed at Suvla Bay on the night of 6–7 August 1915. In September he moved with the Division to be head of the British Salonika Army to support Serbia at the onset of the Macedonian campaign. In 1916 General Mahon took up command of the Western Frontier Force in the Egyptian Expeditionary Force.

He was then appointed as the Commander-in-Chief, Ireland, in 1916 in the lead up to the Anglo-Irish War. He retired from the British Army at the end of August 1921.

After his retirement he was elected as a privy council member of the short-lived Senate of Southern Ireland. He was appointed to Seanad Éireann by the President of the Executive Council, W. T. Cosgrave, in 1922 and 1925. His home, 
Mullaboden in Ballymore-Eustace, County Kildare, was burned down by the IRA in February 1923 during the Irish Civil War. The most valuable furniture had been removed to Dublin after the destruction of Palmerstown, the residence of Lord Mayo, another Kildare member of the Irish Senate, the previous month. A gramophone and  typewriter were stolen and one of Mahon's tunics was taken and worn by one of the republicans for a photo taken of the squad that carried out the arson.

He and his wife, Lady Mahon, formerly Lady Milbanke, widow of Sir John Milbanke, V.C., were not home at the time. In 1923, "malicious injury claims" by the Mahons were filed with Kildare County Council in the amount of more than £60,000; they were awarded £21,341.

Mahon was elected to the Seanad in 1928, and served until his death in 1930.

References

External links

Photograph of Mahon
, by Filson Young at The Project Gutenberg

 

1862 births
1930 deaths
Military personnel from County Galway
8th King's Royal Irish Hussars officers
Commanders-in-Chief, Ireland
Irish officers in the British Army
British Army personnel of the Second Boer War
British Army cavalry generals of World War I
Irish generals
Irish knights
Irish people of World War I
Knights Commander of the Royal Victorian Order
Companions of the Distinguished Service Order
Knights Commander of the Order of the Bath
Members of the Privy Council of Ireland
Members of the 1922 Seanad
Members of the 1925 Seanad
Members of the 1928 Seanad
People from County Galway
Members of the Senate of Southern Ireland
Fellows of the Royal Geographical Society
Independent members of Seanad Éireann
British Army generals